Georgi Karamanliev (born 6 October 1961) is a Bulgarian wrestler. He competed in the men's Greco-Roman 68 kg at the 1988 Summer Olympics.

References

External links
 

1961 births
Living people
Bulgarian male sport wrestlers
Olympic wrestlers of Bulgaria
Wrestlers at the 1988 Summer Olympics
People from Topolovgrad
Sportspeople from Haskovo Province